Hestad is a surname. Notable people with the surname include:

Daniel Berg Hestad, Norwegian footballer
Eirik Hestad, Norwegian footballer
Harry Hestad, Norwegian footballer and manager
Monika Hestad, Norwegian industrial designer and researcher
Stein Olav Hestad, former Norwegian footballer